German submarine U-2323 was a Type XXIII submarine of Nazi Germany's Kriegsmarine during World War II. She was constructed at Hamburg during the spring of 1944, completed on the 18 July and given to Leutnant zur See Walter Angermann to command. A fast high-technology coastal boat, U-2323 was expected to be the new war-winning weapon in the Kriegsmarine 's arsenal.

Design
Like all Type XXIII U-boats, U-2323 had a displacement of  when at the surface and  while submerged. The submarine was powered by one MWM six-cylinder RS134S diesel engine providing , one AEG GU4463-8 double-acting electric motor electric motor providing , and one BBC silent running CCR188 electric motor providing .

U-2323 was fitted with two  torpedo tubes in the bow. She could carry two preloaded torpedoes. The complement was 14–18 men. This class of U-boat did not carry a deck gun.

Service history
The seas around the German coastline were subject to very heavy allied attack during the final two years of the war, as the Royal Air Force sought to restrict German movement around their coasts by sowing thousands of air-dropped naval mines, thus delaying the production and training of new boats, disrupting coastal shipping and destroying several boats before they could become involved in the Battle of the Atlantic.

The U-2323 was a victim of this campaign, when on the 26 July 1944, just eight days old, she was sunk off Möltenort at the entrance to Kiel harbour on her maiden voyage. Two of her crew were killed in the blast, although the survivors managed to safely reach the shore. They were then transferred to other units. The holed boat was raised in early 1945, but was still undergoing repairs in Kiel at the time of the German surrender. It was broken up in situ post-war.

References

Bibliography

External links
 

World War II submarines of Germany
Type XXIII submarines
U-boats sunk by mines
World War II shipwrecks in the Baltic Sea
U-boats commissioned in 1944
U-boats sunk in 1944
1944 ships
Ships built in Hamburg
Maritime incidents in July 1944